Sarzano/Sant'Agostino is a Genoa Metro station, located in the historical centre of Genoa, Italy. The main entrance is in the Piazza di Sarzano near the Church of St. Augustine, now deconsecrated and turned into a museum, with a second entrance on the Mura della Marina, the old seawall. It is the newest station, having opened on 3 April 2006, about a year after the easterly terminus at De Ferrari.

References

External links

Genoa Metro stations
Railway stations opened in 2006
2006 establishments in Italy
Railway stations in Italy opened in the 21st century